Hillcrest School, also known as Hillcrest International Schools, is a British private international day and boarding school located in Nairobi, Kenya. Established in 1965 as a pre-school, the school has grown to now encompass Hillcrest Early Years (HEY), Hillcrest Preparatory School and Hillcrest Secondary School.

History 
The origins of Hillcrest International Schools started with Hillcrest Preparatory School which was founded in 1965 by educationalist Dorothy Noad and long-serving government employee Frank Thompson. Hillcrest Preparatory secured its international school status in 1972, when it became a member of the Independent Association of Prep Schools; joining a conglomerate of British curriculum schools across the world. In 1975 Kenneth Matiba, Stephen Smith, and Frank Thompson partnered to start the Hillcrest Secondary School.

Campus 
It is situated on a  site in the Nairobi suburb of Karen. The school caters for the international, professional, and local business communities.

Hillcrest Early Years 

The school has; Nursery 1 (18 months – 3  years), Nursery 2 (3 – 4 years), Reception (4 – 5 years) and Year 1 (5 – 6 years).

Hillcrest Preparatory School 
The preparatory school's facilities include 32 general classrooms, two laboratories, a library, two art rooms, a multipurpose hall, a  swimming pool, a music centre with four practice rooms and a teaching/rehearsal space, an open-air amphitheatre, two computer laboratories, and a learning-support Center, Design and Technology center and an art room.

Hillcrest Secondary School 
The secondary and preparatory school share facilities such as a twenty five metre pool, canoes, basketball courts and netball courts.
There is a conserved area commonly known as 'The Nature Trail' which mainly consists of indigenous trees and hosts animals such as jackals, snakes, birds and hares.

The sixth form has 60 to 75 students in each year, most of whom continue to university, mainly in the UK, but also in the United States, Canada, Europe and South Africa.

Boarding 
There is also a boarding house, Toad Hall, which sits on the school site, capable of housing 16 girls and 16 boys.

Academics 
The school year runs from September to July and IGCSE/'O' and 'A' level exams are set and marked by CIE (Cambridge International Examinations), AQA and Edexcel. The school has also recently introduced BTEC programmes in Performing arts, Sports, Business, Travel & Tourism and Art & Design (Photography).

The school, of about 440 students, has its largest groups coming from Kenya and Britain. The staff are recruited from Britain and Kenya.

Notable alumni 

 Jo Theones, a DJ at Fox FM in Oxford
 Zain Verjee, anchor woman at CNN international

References

External links 

Hillcrest International Schools official website

International schools in Kenya
Cambridge schools in Kenya
Schools in Nairobi
Educational institutions established in 1975
1975 establishments in Kenya